The sixteenth series of the British medical drama television series Holby City commenced airing in the United Kingdom on BBC One on 15 October 2013. The series ran for 52 episodes.

Episodes

Production
The series is produced by the BBC and will air on BBC One and BBC One HD in the United Kingdom. Oliver Kent is the executive producer. Simon Harper is the series producer.

Cast

Overview 

All of the main characters carried over from the previous series, with the exception of director of surgery and chief executive officer Henrik Hanssen (Guy Henry), who left the hospital to return to Sweden. Staff nurse Chantelle Lane (Lauren Drummond) left in episode 5. Long-serving Chrissie Williams (Tina Hobley) left in episode 6. New chief executive officer and director of surgery, neurosurgeon Guy Self (John Michie) joined as of episode 7 followed quickly by director of nursing Colette Sheward (Louise Delamere) in episode 8. Both Antoine Malick (Jimmy Akingbola) and his son, Jake Patterson (Louis Payne) left in episode 7. Junior doctor Gemma Wilde (Ty Glaser) departed in episode 10, along with general surgeon Michael Spence (Hari Dhillon), who left for an "extended break from the series". Consultant anesthetist Edward Campbell (Aden Gillett) left the show after episode 13. Both Dominic Copeland (David Ames) and Adele Effanga (Petra Letang) arrived in episode 14, Ames having appeared as a recurring character in the previous series. Raffaello "Raf" di Lucca (Joe McFadden) arrived in episode 16. Raf's wife, Amy Teo (Wendy Kweh) also joined the team as consultant pharmacist on AAU from episode 24. Bonnie Wallis (Carlyss Peer) was killed off on her wedding day in episode 25. Jesse Law (Don Gilet) joined the team as a consultant anesthetist on Keller from episode 28 then left in episode 39. Adrian Fletcher arrived in episode 44. Essie Harrison (Kaye Wragg) arrived in episode 30 then left in episode 47. Sam Stockman reprised his role as Elliot's son, James Hope in episode 41, having previously appeared as a recurring character between 2006 and 2007.

Main characters 
Jimmy Akingbola as Antoine Malick (until episode 7)
Chizzy Akudolu as Mo Effanga
David Ames as Dominic Copeland (from episode 14)
Camilla Arfwedson as Zosia March
Bob Barrett as Sacha Levy
Paul Bradley as Elliot Hope
Louise Delamere as Colette Sheward (from episode 8)
Hari Dhillon as Michael Spence (until episode 10)
Lauren Drummond as Chantelle Lane (until episode 5)
Aden Gillett as Edward Campbell (until episode 13)
Ty Glaser as Gemma Wilde (until episode 10)
Tina Hobley as Chrissie Williams (until episode 6)
Jules Knight as Harry Tressler
Petra Letang as Adele Effanga (from episode 14)
Rosie Marcel as Jac Naylor
Joe McFadden as Raf di Lucca (from episode 16)
Niamh McGrady as Mary-Claire Carter (until episode 28, from episode 52)
John Michie as Guy Self (from episode 7)
Rob Ostlere as Arthur Digby
Hugh Quarshie as Ric Griffin (until episode 23, episodes 43−49)
Catherine Russell as Serena Campbell
Michael Thomson as Jonny Maconie
Alex Walkinshaw as Fletch (from episode 44)

Recurring and guest characters 
Jotham Annan as Nathan Hargreave (until episode 4)
Tom Beard as Jeremy Solis (episodes 14−16)
Don Gilet as Jesse Law (episodes 28−39)
Ben Hull as Derwood "Mr T" Thompson
Wendy Kweh as Amy Teo (from episode 24)
Amanda Mealing as Connie Beauchamp (episode 42)
Alan Morrissey as Kyle Greenham (from episode 50)
Louis Payne as Jake Patterson (episodes 1−7)
Carlyss Peer as Bonnie Wallis (until episode 25)
Sam Stockman as James Hope (episode 41)
Kaye Wragg as Essie Harrison (episodes 30−47)
Sandra Voe as Adrienne McKinnie

References
General

 Viewing figures: 

Specific

16
2013 British television seasons
2014 British television seasons